Parogulnius is a genus of spiders in the family Theridiosomatidae. It was first described in 1953 by Archer. , it contains only one species, Parogulnius hypsigaster, found in the United States.

References

Theridiosomatidae
Monotypic Araneomorphae genera
Spiders of the United States